NZCA Lines (stylised as NZCA/LINES) are a British synthpop band founded by Michael Lovett. Previous members of the band include Charlotte Hatherley and Sarah Jones.

Discography
NZCA/LINES (Lo Recordings, 2012)
Infinite Summer (Memphis Industries, 2016)
Pure Luxury (Memphis Industries, 2020)

References

British synth-pop groups
Memphis Industries artists